NeuroToxicology is a peer-reviewed scientific journal covering research on the toxicology of the nervous system. It was established in 1979 and originally published by Intox Press, until it was acquired by Elsevier in 2001. The editor-in-chief is  Joan Marie Cranmer (University of Arkansas for Medical Sciences).

Abstracting and indexing 
The journal is abstracted and indexed in:

According to the Journal Citation Reports, the journal has a 2014 impact factor of 3.379, ranking it 20th out of 87 journals in the category "Toxicology".

References

External links 
 

Elsevier academic journals
Publications established in 1979
Toxicology journals
Bimonthly journals
Neuroscience journals
English-language journals